is a Japanese-born British solo violinist and composer. She has released four solo albums and one digital EP.

Personal life
Yukawa was born in Tokyo, Japan, to English ballet dancer Susanne Bayly and Japanese banker Akihisa Yukawa one month after her father died in the 1985 Japan Airlines Flight 123 disaster. Yukawa has lived in the United Kingdom since she was 2 months old and began learning violin when she was 5 years old.

Because Diana was born after her father's death, his name was excluded from her British birth certificate until the High Court of England in March 2000 ruled that, under the laws of England and Wales, Diana and her pianist sister Cassie were also in the eyes of the law Akihisa's offspring. The certificate was amended to include the name in June 2009.

Yukawa's brother-in-law is the actor Simon McBurney.

Career
Yukawa has performed solo at The Royal Albert Hall, Hollywood Bowl, Wilderness Festival, Latitude Festival, St James Piccadilly, Cadogan Hall, the Khalifa Stadium in Qatar, and at the 2012 New Year concert at Burj in Dubai. she has supported Katherine Jenkins at Cheltenham Racecourse, the Tivoli Festival, the Place Des Arts in Montreal for Vincero. opened a new music event, Jam Dubai, headlined at Kenwood House Picnic Concerts on 7 August, performed music from Halo at the Video Game Awards 2010, and opened the FINA world swimming championship in Dubai.

Yukawa has collaborated with Nitin Sawhney, Jeff Beck, Paul Oakenfold, Japanese group Deen, Craig Armstrong and appeared on various PBS shows.

Yukawa played during a memorial service for the Japan Airlines Flight 123 victims, including her father, on 12 August 2009. The service included playing a piece of music she has composed for her father.

In 2015 Yukawa began collaborating with electronic artists John Foxx and Benge in a musical group named Ghost Harmonic.

Discography

Solo
 Elegy (AKA La Campanella) (September 2000); reached No. 1 in Japan
 Concerto (August 2001)
 The Butterfly Effect (October 2009)
 Finding the Parallel (EP) (March 2013)
 Spaces Between Shadows (February 2016)
 Spirals (September 2022)
 with Ghost Harmonic
 Codex (25 May 2015)

References

External links

Ghost Harmonic official website

English violinists
Japanese violinists
Japanese women violinists
Women classical violinists
1985 births
Living people
English people of Japanese descent
Japanese people of English descent
Musicians from Tokyo
20th-century classical violinists
21st-century classical violinists
20th-century English women musicians
21st-century English women musicians